Promontory Point is the cape or southernmost point of the peninsula formed where the Promontory Mountains project into the northern Great Salt Lake in southeastern Box Elder County, Utah, United States.

Description

The unincorporated community of Promontory and its location, Promontory Summit, are also frequently referred to as "Promontory Point".

See also

References

External links

Cliffs of the United States
Great Salt Lake
Headlands of the United States
Landforms of Box Elder County, Utah